Gary Mathieu Groh (born October 11, 1944) is an American professional golfer who played on the PGA Tour in the 1970s.

Groh was born in Chicago, Illinois. He attended Michigan State University and turned pro in 1968.

Groh played on the PGA Tour from 1971 to 1978 and won one event. His career year was 1975 when he won the Hawaiian Open, earned $68,296 and finished 31st on the money list. His best finish in a major championship was T18 at the U.S. Open in 1975.

After leaving the PGA Tour, Groh took a job as head pro at Bob O' Link Golf Club in Highland Park, Illinois – a job he has held for more than a quarter of a century. In 1995, he joined the Senior PGA Tour and has played in a limited number of events; his best finish in this venue is T17 at the 1995 Ameritech Senior Open. He owns seven course records, including a round of 64 in 1985 at the world-famous Ballybunion in Ireland. Groh lives in Lake Bluff, Illinois.

Professional wins (22)

PGA Tour wins (1)

Other wins (6)
1972 Vern Parsell Buick Open
1983 Illinois PGA Championship
1986 Illinois PGA Championship
1989 Illinois PGA Championship
1994 Illinois Open Championship
2002 Illinois PGA Championship

Senior wins (15)
1995 Illinois PGA Senior Match Play Championship, Illinois Senior PGA Championship
1996 Illinois PGA Senior Match Play Championship, Illinois Senior PGA Championship
1997 Illinois PGA Senior Match Play Championship, Illinois Senior PGA Championship
1998 Illinois Senior PGA Championship
1999 Illinois Senior PGA Championship
2000 Illinois Senior Open Championship, Illinois Senior PGA Championship
2002 Illinois Senior PGA Championship, Illinois PGA Section Championship
2003 Illinois Senior Open Championship, Illinois PGA Section Championship
2004 Illinois PGA Section Championship

See also
Spring 1969 PGA Tour Qualifying School graduates
1971 PGA Tour Qualifying School graduates

References

External links

American male golfers
Michigan State Spartans men's golfers
PGA Tour golfers
PGA Tour Champions golfers
Golfers from Chicago
People from Lake Bluff, Illinois
1944 births
Living people